Žljeb is a mountain located between western Kosovo and the Rožaje Municipality of eastern Montenegro. It is a part of the Accursed Mountains (or Prokletije/Bjëshket e Nemurë), located between the mountains of Hajla and Mokna. The majority of the land within the mountain belongs to Kosovo, while a minority of it belongs to Montenegro.. The White Drin (or Bijeli Drim) river originates from within the mountain. 

The Žljeb mountain also forms part of the eastern side of the Rugova Canyon. Rusulija's slopes are covered with rich forests and near the summit there are several meadows. The road from the city of Rožaje to Pejë (or Peć) is located within the foothills of the mountains, and also contains 2 or 3 villages within that road. It also contains the border crossings between Montenegro and Kosovo, the Montenegrin one is called "Kula/Kulla".

Notes and references
Notes:

References:

Rožaje Municipality
Mountains of Kosovo
Mountains of Montenegro
Accursed Mountains
Two-thousanders of Kosovo
Two-thousanders of Montenegro